Keekan  is a village in Kasaragod district in the state of Kerala, India.

Demographics
 India census, Keekan had a population of 9540 with 4565 males and 4975 females.

Transportation
Local roads have access to NH.66 which connects to Mangalore in the north and Calicut in the south. The nearest railway station is Kanhangad on Mangalore-Palakkad line. There are airports at Mangalore and Calicut.

References

Kanhangad area